"National Apostasy" was a sermon preached by John Keble on 14 July 1833. The sermon has traditionally been considered as the beginning of the Oxford Movement of high church Anglicans.

Background

The previous five years had seen radical changes to the nature of the relationship between the Church of England and the state. In 1828 the centuries-old discrimination against Protestant Dissenters was repealed and in 1829 Catholic Emancipation was passed. In 1830 the Pittite Tory regime fell and the first Whig government in a generation took office, dedicated to reform.

Many Anglican churchmen, after the Whig triumph of the Reform Act 1832, believed that the Whigs were preparing to invade the rights and alter the constitution of the Church. In 1833 the Whigs passed the Church Temporalities Act. This reorganised the Church of Ireland and reduced its bishoprics from 22 to 12. This seemed to justify Anglican fears that the government was prepared to act against church opinion.

Sermon

The text of the sermon was 1 Samuel 12:23: "As for me, God forbid that I should sin against the Lord in ceasing to pray for you: but I will teach you the good and the right way".

After talking about sin and God's punishment, Keble said:

The case is at least possible, of a nation, having for centuries acknowledged, as an essential part of its theory of government, that, as a Christian nation, she is also a part of Christ's Church, and bound, in all her legislation and policy, by the fundamental rules of that Church—the case is, I say, conceivable, of a government and people, so constituted, deliberately throwing off the restraint, which in many respects such a principle would impose on them, nay, disavowing the principle itself; and that, on the plea, that other states, as flourishing or more so in regard of wealth and dominion, do well enough without it. Is not this desiring, like the Jews, to have an earthly king over them, when the Lord their God is their King? Is it not saying in other words, “We will be as the heathen, the families of the countries,” the aliens to the Church of our Redeemer?

Keble claimed that this movement was always "traceable to the same decay or want of faith, the same deficiency in Christian resignation and thankfulness, which leads so many, as individuals, to disdain and forfeit the blessings of the Gospel. Men not impressed with religious principle attribute their ill success in life,—the hard times they have to struggle with,—to anything rather than their own ill-desert: and the institutions of the country, ecclesiastical and civil, are always at hand to bear the blame of whatever seems to be going amiss". The Israelites of Samuel's time were guilty of this by demanding a change in their constitution. Keble saw contemporary parallels to this:

And so, in modern times, when liberties are to be taken, and the intrusive passions of men to be indulged, precedent and permission, or what sounds like them, may be easily found and quoted for everything. But Samuel, in God's Name, silenced all this, giving them to understand, that in His sight the whole was a question of motive and purpose, not of ostensible and colourable argument;—in His sight, I say, to Whom we, as well as they, are nationally responsible for much more than the soundness of our deductions as matter of disputation, or of law; we are responsible for the meaning and temper in which we deal with His Holy Church, established among us for the salvation of our souls.

These were "omens and tokens of an Apostate Mind in a nation". He gave further examples:

One of the most alarming, as a symptom, is the growing indifference, in which men indulge themselves, to other men's religious sentiments. Under the guise of charity and toleration we are come almost to this pass; that no difference, in matters of faith, is to disqualify for our approbation and confidence, whether in public or domestic life. Can we conceal it from ourselves, that every year the practice is becoming more common, of trusting men unreservedly in the most delicate and important matters, without one serious inquiry, whether they do not hold principles which make it impossible for them to be loyal to their Creator, Redeemer, and Sanctifier? Are not offices conferred, partnerships formed, intimacies courted,—nay (what is almost too painful to think of), do not parents commit their children to be educated, do they not encourage them to intermarry, in houses, on which Apostolical Authority would rather teach them to set a mark, as unfit to be entered by a faithful servant of Christ?

Keble claimed he was not speaking of "public measures only or chiefly...But I speak of the spirit which leads men to exult in every step of that kind; to congratulate one another on the supposed decay of what they call an exclusive system". This led him to say:

The point really to be considered is, whether, according to the coolest estimate, the fashionable liberality of this generation be not ascribable, in a great measure, to the same temper which led the Jews voluntarily to set about degrading themselves to a level with the idolatrous Gentiles? And, if it be true anywhere, that such enactments are forced on the Legislature by public opinion, is APOSTASY too hard a word to describe the temper of that nation?

Keble claimed this same tendency was apparent in "the surly or scornful impatience often exhibited...when Christian motives are suggested, and checks from Christian principles attempted to be enforced on their public conduct". Furthermore, there had been "observable a growing disinclination, on the part of those bound by VOLUNTARY OATHS, to whatever reminds them of their obligation; a growing disposition to explain it all away". People who thought of such conduct lightly were "indulging or encouraging a profane dislike of God's awful Presence; a general tendency, as a people, to leave Him out of all their thoughts".

Impatience under pastoral authority, Keble warned, was regarded by Jesus "as a never-failing symptom of an unchristian temper", quoted his words in Luke 10:16: "He that heareth you, heareth Me; and he that despiseth you, despiseth Me". Keble claimed this as evidence that

... disrespect to the Successors of the Apostles, as such, is an unquestionable symptom of enmity to Him, Who gave them their commission at first, and has pledged Himself to be with them for ever. Suppose such disrespect general and national, suppose it also avowedly grounded not on any fancied tenet of religion, but on mere human reasons of popularity and expediency, either there is no meaning at all in these emphatic declarations of our Lord, or that nation, how highly soever she may think of her religion and morality, stands convicted in His sight of a direct disavowal of His Sovereignty.

Keble noted that Saul sinned by listening to the voice of the people rather than obeying God, citing 1 Samuel 15:24. Keble warned:

God forbid, that any Christian land should ever, by her prevailing temper and policy, revive the memory and likeness of Saul, or incur a sentence of reprobation like his. But if such a thing should be, the crimes of that nation will probably begin in infringement on Apostolical Rights; she will end in persecuting the true Church; and in the several stages of her melancholy career, she will continually be led on from bad to worse by vain endeavours at accommodation and compromise with evil. Sometimes toleration may be the word, as with Saul when he spared the Amalekites; sometimes state security, as when he sought the life of David; sometimes sympathy with popular feeling, as appears to have been the case, when violating solemn treaties, he attempted to exterminate the remnant of the Gibeonites, in his zeal for the children of Israel and Judah (2 Sam. xxi. 2). Such are the sad but obvious results of separating religious resignation altogether from men's notions of civil duty.

Keble posed another question: "What should be the tenor of their conduct, who find themselves cast on such times of decay and danger? How may a man best reconcile his allegiance to God and his Church with his duty to his country, that country, which now, by the supposition, is fast becoming hostile to the Church, and cannot therefore long be the friend of God?" He pointed to the conduct of Samuel who was faced with similar circumstances and who combined "sweetness with firmness, of consideration with energy, [that] constitute[d] the temper of a perfect public man". Samuel was publicly dismayed at the Israelites' conduct and although he obeyed God in letting the people make their own way he protested "in the most distinct and solemn tone, so as to throw the whole blame of what might ensue on their wilfulness". He continued to serve but with a heavy heart: "God forbid that I should sin against the Lord in ceasing to pray for you: but I will teach you the good and the right way."

Keble said that if "the Apostolical Church should be forsaken, degraded, nay trampled on and despoiled by the State and people of England, I cannot conceive a kinder wish for her, on the part of her most affectionate and dutiful children, than that she may, consistently, act in the spirit of this most noble sentence". If such a calamity should happen, the Church would have to be constant in intercession. The second duty incumbent upon Christians would be remonstrance: "calm, distinct, and persevering, in public and in private, direct and indirect, by word, look, and demeanour, is the unequivocal duty of every Christian, according to his opportunities, when the Church landmarks are being broken down".

Keble countered against rebellion against an apostatised state: "On the same principle, come what may, we have ill learned the lessons of our Church, if we permit our patriotism to decay, together with the protecting care of the State. 'The powers that be are ordained of God,' whether they foster the true church or no. Submission and order are still duties. They were so in the days of pagan persecution; and the more of loyal and affectionate feeling we endeavour to mingle with our obedience, the better." Instead, "the surest way to uphold or restore our endangered Church, will be for each of her anxious children, in his own place and station, to resign himself more thoroughly to his God and Saviour in those duties, public and private, which are not immediately affected by the emergencies of the moment: the daily and hourly duties, I mean, of piety, purity, charity, justice".

Keble ended his sermon:

These cautions being duly observed, I do not see how any person can devote himself too entirely to the cause of the Apostolical Church in these realms. There may be, as far as he knows, but a very few to sympathise with him. He may have to wait long, and very likely pass out of this world before he see any abatement in the triumph of disorder and irreligion. But, if he be consistent, he possesses, to the utmost, the personal consolations of a good Christian: and as a true Churchman, he has that encouragement, which no other cause in the world can impart in the same degree:—he is calmly, soberly, demonstrably, SURE, that, sooner or later, HIS WILL BE THE WINNING SIDE, and that the victory will be complete, universal, eternal.

He need not fear to look upon the efforts of anti-Christian powers, as did the holy Apostles themselves, who welcomed the first persecution in the words of the Psalmist:

“Why do the heathen rage, and the people imagine a vain thing?

“The kings of the earth stand up, and the rulers take counsel together, against the Lord, and against His Anointed.

“For of a truth against Thy Holy Child Jesus, Whom Thou hast anointed, both Herod and Pontius Pilate, with the Gentiles, and the people of Israel, were gathered together,—

“FOR TO DO WHATSOEVER THY HAND AND THY COUNSEL DETERMINED BEFORE TO BE DONE”.

Reception

Historians such as R. W. Church in his classic study of the Oxford Movement have followed Newman in regarding Keble's sermon as the beginning of the Movement. However F. L. Cross disputed the sermon's importance as the starting point of the Movement.

References

Footnotes

Bibliography

External links
Full text of the sermon 

History of the Church of England
1833 in the United Kingdom
Sermons
1833 works
Anglican theology and doctrine